Ismar Gorčić (born 22 May 1983) is a Bosnian former professional tennis player. He is currently a tennis coach.

Career statistics

Singles titles (0)

Doubles titles (9)

References

Sources

1983 births
Living people
Bosnia and Herzegovina male tennis players